The 2002 season was the Cleveland Browns' 54th as a professional sports franchise, their 50th as a member of the National Football League, and the second season under head coach Butch Davis.

In their opener against the Kansas City Chiefs, linebacker Dwayne Rudd cost the Browns a victory when he threw his helmet in celebration unaware the play was still going on, incurring an unsportsmanlike conduct penalty. Because the clock expired during the play the Browns' unsportsmanlike conduct occurred on, per NFL rules, the Chiefs were given one untimed down. Chiefs' kicker Morten Andersen made the 30-yard field goal to win the game.

The Browns made their first playoff appearance since their re-activation. It was only the Browns' fourth year since returning to the league effectively as an expansion team, and their first winning season. The Browns then lost to the Pittsburgh Steelers in the wild card round. The Browns would not make the NFL playoffs again until 2020.
The Browns owner Al Lerner stepped down on October 2 and died on October 23, 2002 from brain cancer. His son, Randy Lerner took over the team until 2012. The Browns wore a patch with the initials "AL" for the remainder of the season and became a fixture on their uniforms to commemorate Lerner.

Offseason

2002 NFL Draft

Undrafted free agents

Personnel

Roster

Regular season

Schedule
Apart from their AFC North division games, the Browns played against the AFC South and NFC South according to the NFL's new conference rotation, and played the Chiefs and Jets based on 2001 standings with respect to the newly aligned divisions.

Note: Intra-divisional opponents are in bold text.

Game summaries

Week 1: vs. Kansas City Chiefs

Week 8: at New York Jets

Standings

Postseason

Game summaries

References

External links 
 2002 Cleveland Browns at Pro Football Reference (Profootballreference.com)
 2002 Cleveland Browns Statistics at jt-sw.com
 2002 Cleveland Browns Schedule at jt-sw.com
 2002 Cleveland Browns at DatabaseFootball.com  

Cleveland
Cleveland Browns seasons
Cleveland